Kathleen Weiß (born ) is a German volleyball player. She plays as setter and has over 300 appearances for the Germany women's national volleyball team. At club level she plays for Czech VK Agel Prostějov. Weiß has played in many international competitions (FIVB World Championships, FIVB World Cup, FIVB World Grand Prix, European Championships, European Leagues, European Games) and won various national championships and cups with the clubs she played for.

Career
Born in Schwerin, Weiß began playing volleyball at the age of eight when her mother, who was a volleyball player, made a training group teaching techniques and tricks. She then joining her town's club Schweriner SC in 1993, where she progressed through the youth team system until reaching the first team and becoming professional. In 2000, she was combining her studies with volleyball training while trying to break into the first team. She then played for 2 Bundesliga club VC Parchim from 2001 to 2003, gaining more playing opportunities and experience.

She also became involved in the Germany women's national volleyball team as a teenager, firstly in the youth national teams, appearing at youth and junior international competitions from 2001 until 2003, winning the gold medal at the 2001 European Youth Olympics during that period. On 10 March 2003, she made her debut for the senior team in a match against Russia which ended with Germany losing by 2–3. Due to her height (1.71 metres), she was used as a libero by then national team coach Hee Wan-Lee.

Her return to Schweriner SC in 2003 and the appointment of Giovanni Guidetti as the national team head coach in 2006, who decided to use her as a setter (her original position), provided Weiß with opportunities and her performances started to improve. In 2005–06, she won the German Bundesliga (championship) and Cup. In the following season she finished third at the 2006–07 CEV Top Teams Cup, won the German Cup again and despite missing on the championship, was elected the best setter of the Bundesliga. Her performances at the 2006 FIVB Volleyball Women's World Championship were praised by Guidetti, who recognized her improvement. In August 2008, she decided to look for new challenges and leave Schweriner SC.

In September 2008, she moved to the Netherlands to play for DELA Martinus, to improve further her development under head coach Avital Selinger a former experienced Dutch international player. Her only season in the Dutch club yielded a Dutch Championship, Cup and Super Cup titles.

With the national team she won a bronze medal at the 2009 World Grand Prix before joining Italian Serie A1 club Despar Perugia on 16 September 2009. Later that year she finish fourth with the national team in the 2009 European Championship, after losing the hosts Poland in the bronze medal match.

Ahead of the 2010–11 season she moved to Igtisadchi Baku of the Azerbaijani Super League. The club reached the semifinals of the 2010–11 CEV Women's Challenge Cup, missing a place in the final by losing to Lokomotiv Baku in the golden set.

She returned to Italy in July 2011, when she joined Serie A1 club Spes Conegliano. A few months later she won a silver medal with the national team at the 2011 European Championship. Due to financial issues, Spes Conegliano was forced to withdraw from the league and the club closed down in December 2011. Wishing to remain in Italy, she joined Chieri Torino mid-season in January 2012.

Remaining in the Italian Serie A1, she switched clubs, joining Foppapedretti Bergamo for the 2012–13 season. With the national team she won the 2013 European Volleyball League and finish second at the 2013 European Championship. After her first season at Bergamo, a renewed contract is agreed with the club for another season. She was runner up of the 2013–14 Italian Cup after losing the final with Bergamo to Rebecchi Nordmeccanica Piacenza.

Serving the national team in the summer of 2014, she won the 2014 Montreux Volley Masters and was second at the 2014 European League.

In October 2014, she joined AGEL Prostějov of the Czech Extraliga. She won the Czech Cup and Championship in the 2014–15 season, and after playing a key role during the season, with the club going undefeated in both national competitions, she agreed to a new contract with the club. With the national team, she reached the quarterfinals of the 2015 European Games in Baku. On 18 July 2015, she made her 300th appearance for the German national team in a 3–1 win against Serbia at the 2015 World Grand Prix. In her second season with AGEL Prostějov, she won the double (Czech championship and cup) for a second time in a row.

In October 2016, she signed with MKS Dąbrowa Górnicza, a club of the Polish Orlen Liga. Her season in Poland yielded a 5th place in the League, a cup quarterfinals and group stage matches at the 2016–17 CEV Women's Champions League.

On 16 June 2017, AGEL Prostějov announced Weiß return to the club for the 2017–18 season.

Personal life
She is the daughter of Gerald Weiß and Petra Weiß. Both were athletes at SC Traktor Schwerin, her father a javelin thrower and her mother a volleyball player.

Clubs
  Schweriner SC (1993–2001)
  VC Parchim (2001–2003)
  Schweriner SC (2003–2008)
  DELA Martinus Amstelveen (2008–2009)
  Despar Perugia (2009–2010)
  İqtisadçı Bakı (2010–2011)
  Spes Conegliano (2011–2012)
  Chieri Torino Volley Club (Jan 2012–May 2012)
  Foppapedretti Bergamo (2012–2014)
  AGEL Prostějov (2014–2016)
  MKS Dąbrowa Górnicza (2016–2017)
  AGEL Prostějov (2017–present)

Awards

Individual
 2006–07 German Championship "Best Setter"

National team results

Junior
 2001 Girls' Youth European Volleyball Championship — 4th place
 2001 European Youth Summer Olympic Festival —  Gold medal
 2002 Women's Junior European Volleyball Championship — 8th place
 2003 FIVB Volleyball Women's U20 World Championship — 5th place

Senior
 2003 FIVB Volleyball World Grand Prix — 7th place
 2004 Montreux Volley Masters — 5th place
 2004 FIVB Volleyball World Grand Prix — 6th place
 2005 FIVB Volleyball World Grand Prix — 10th place
 2006 Montreux Volley Masters — 5th place
 2006 FIVB Volleyball Women's World Championship — 11th place
 2007 Montreux Volley Masters — 5th place
 2007 Women's European Volleyball Championship — 6th place
 2009 Montreux Volley Masters — 6th place
 2009 FIVB Volleyball World Grand Prix —  Bronze medal
 2009 Women's European Volleyball Championship — 4th place
 2010 Montreux Volley Masters — 7th place
 2010 FIVB Volleyball World Grand Prix — 9th place
 2010 FIVB Volleyball Women's World Championship — 7th place
 2011 Montreux Volley Masters — 6th place
 2011 FIVB Volleyball World Grand Prix — 13th place
 2011 Women's European Volleyball Championship —  Silver medal
 2011 FIVB Volleyball Women's World Cup — 6th place
 2012 FIVB Volleyball World Grand Prix — 7th place
 2013 Women's European Volleyball League —  Gold medal
 2013 FIVB Volleyball World Grand Prix — 11th place
 2013 Women's European Volleyball Championship —  Silver medal
 2014 Montreux Volley Masters —  Gold medal
 2014 Women's European Volleyball League —  Silver medal
 2014 FIVB Volleyball World Grand Prix — 10th place
 2014 FIVB Volleyball Women's World Championship — 9th place
 2015 European Games — 5th place
 2015 FIVB Volleyball World Grand Prix — 7th
 2015 Women's European Volleyball Championship — 5th place

Club honours
 2005–06 German Championship —  Gold medal (with Schweriner SC)
 2005–06 German Cup —  Gold medal (with Schweriner SC)
 2006–07 CEV Top Teams Cup —  Bronze medal (with Schweriner SC)
 2006–07 German Championship —  Silver medal (with Schweriner SC)
 2006–07 German Cup —  Gold medal (with Schweriner SC)
 2007–08 German Championship —  Bronze medal (with Schweriner SC)
 2008–09 Dutch Championship —  Gold medal (with DELA Martinus)
 2008–09 Dutch Cup —  Gold medal (with DELA Martinus)
 2008–09 Dutch Super Cup —  Gold medal (with DELA Martinus)
 2010–11 Azerbaijani Championship —  Bronze medal (with Igtisadchi Baku)
 2013–14 Italian Cup —  Silver medal (with Foppapedretti Bergamo)
 2014–15 Czech Championship —  Gold medal (with AGEL Prostějov)
 2014–15 Czech Cup —  Gold medal (with AGEL Prostějov)
 2015–16 Czech Championship —  Gold medal (with AGEL Prostějov)
 2015–16 Czech Cup —  Gold medal (with AGEL Prostějov)

References

External links

 Profile at CEV
 Profile  at legavolleyfemminile.it

1984 births
Living people
Sportspeople from Schwerin
German women's volleyball players
European Games competitors for Germany
Volleyball players at the 2015 European Games
Expatriate volleyball players in Azerbaijan
Expatriate volleyball players in Italy
Expatriate volleyball players in the Czech Republic
Expatriate volleyball players in Poland
Expatriate volleyball players in the Netherlands
German expatriate sportspeople in Poland
German expatriate sportspeople in the Netherlands
German expatriate sportspeople in the Czech Republic
German expatriate sportspeople in Azerbaijan
German expatriate sportspeople in Italy